This is a list of public art in Pimlico, a district in the City of Westminster, London.

References

Bibliography

 

 

 

 

 

 

Pimlico
Public art